John Robert Tillman (March 24, 1937 – June 23, 2000) was an American professional baseball player. He played in Major League Baseball as a catcher for the Boston Red Sox (1962–67), New York Yankees (1967), and Atlanta Braves (1968–70).

Born in Nashville, Tennessee, Tillman graduated from Isaac Litton High School and attended Middle Tennessee State University and Georgia Tech. He made the 1962 Red Sox' roster out of spring training as one of Boston's three catchers. After drawing walks in his first two MLB plate appearances, Tillman connected for a solo home run against Ted Bowsfield of the Los Angeles Angels in his first official at bat in the majors on May 19 at Fenway Park.

Tillman caught two no-hitters during his Red Sox days: Earl Wilson's in 1962, and Dave Morehead's in 1965. He spent the first four months of the Red Sox' pennant-winning  season on the Boston roster, getting into 30 games, before he was sold to the Yankees on August 8. He later helped the  Braves win the National League West Division title, appearing in 69 games, 52 as starting catcher. Tillman was also involved in a notable trade after the 1967 season when he was shipped from the Yankees to the Braves for third baseman Bobby Cox. Cox would eventually begin his Baseball Hall of Fame managing career in the New York farm system. Tillman was dealt from the Braves to the Milwaukee Brewers for Hank Allen and minor-league infielder John Ryan at the Winter Meetings on December 2, 1970.

In nine seasons he played in 775 games and had 2,329 at-bats, 189 runs, 540 hits, 68 doubles, 10 triples, 79 home runs, 282 RBI, 1 stolen base, 228 walks, a .232 batting average, a .300 on-base percentage, a .371 slugging percentage, 865 total bases, 9 sacrifice hits, 14 sacrifice flies, and 33 intentional walks. 

He died in Gallatin, Tennessee, at the age of 63.

See also
 List of Major League Baseball players with a home run in their first major league at bat

References

External links

1937 births
2000 deaths
Allentown Red Sox players
Atlanta Braves players
Baseball players from Nashville, Tennessee
Boston Red Sox players
Major League Baseball catchers
Middle Tennessee Blue Raiders baseball players
Minneapolis Millers (baseball) players
New York Yankees players
Raleigh Capitals players
Seattle Rainiers players